Hercules in New York is a 1970 American fantasy-comedy film directed by Arthur Allan Seidelman and written by Aubrey Wisberg. It stars Arnold Schwarzenegger in his acting debut as the eponymous divine hero, who engages in escapades after traveling to New York City. Produced independently by Wisberg on a budget of $300,000, the film was shot entirely on location.

Plot
Hercules, at Olympus, berates his father Zeus for not allowing him to leave the gods' abode to adventure on Earth. Eventually Zeus sends Hercules, on a beam, to the land of men.

After some strange encounters in the air and at sea, including scaring an old woman on a passenger jet, Hercules arrives in New York City, where hilarity ensues in the form of interactions with various New Yorkers, who regard him as physically superior but socially awkward. He befriends a skinny little man called Pretzie, named because he sells pretzels. Hercules becomes a successful professional wrestler.

Zeus, watching Hercules from the heights, becomes irritated with Hercules' antics, which he feels are making a mockery of the gods, and calls on Mercury to stop Hercules. After Mercury tries but fails to bring Hercules home, Zeus orders Nemesis to see to it that Hercules is consigned to the infernal regions ruled over by Pluto.

However, Juno instead convinces Nemesis to poison Hercules with a poison that would strip him of his divinity and then talk to Pluto. Nemesis informs Pluto of what is happening and he bets a large sum of money against Hercules in an upcoming strongman competition with Hercules' gangster manager. When Hercules loses the strongman competition his friends try to head off Hercules' angry manager's henchmen, but Hercules follows them to save them.

Meanwhile, Zeus uncovers the truth from Nemesis as to what is happening but only intervenes at the last minute to restore Hercules' divinity, not wanting any son of his to die at the hands of a mortal.

Hercules defeats the gangsters and realizes that he has been disobedient and returns to the heavens shortly after, only saying good-bye to Pretzie over a radio after he leaves.

In the heavens, Zeus tells Juno and Hercules that he will not punish Hercules for his behavior as they ask him about it and then asks to be left alone. They leave him alone, and upon their departure, Zeus sneaks out of the heavens and descends to Earth, scaring a passenger jet on his way down.

Cast

Production

Hercules in New York was the acting debut of Arnold Schwarzenegger, who was 22 years old. At the time he was living in Los Angeles and making ends meet by running a bricklaying business with fellow bodybuilder Franco Columbu, while weight training and participating in bodybuilding competitions. Schwarzenegger, who had expressed interest in pursuing an acting career, auditioned at the encouragement of his friend Reg Park, a successful bodybuilder who had starred in a series of successful “Hercules” films produced in Italy. According to Schwarzenegger, during his audition his agent said he had years of "stage" experience, implying theater, when he had only appeared on bodybuilding stages.

The film was also the directorial debut of Arthur Allan Seidelman, who up until then had only directed theatre. The film was independently produced on a low budget, and filmed entirely in real locations in New York City. Several scenes including an elaborate chariot chase were shot without permits.

Playing the film's title character, Schwarzenegger, because of his long last name and to play off the name of fellow cast member comedian Arnold Stang, is credited as "Arnold Strong 'Mr. Universe'". At the time filming began, Schwarzenegger had just come in first place in both professional and amateur Universe Championships. Production of the film coincided with his training for the competition for the second year in a row, and after it ended, he won the professional title again, beating Park.

Schwarzenegger had all his lines dubbed by an uncredited voice actor due to his thick Austrian accent, although the Trimark DVD has an "Original English Dialogue" audio track with Arnold's voice. However, in that version's final scene, Schwarzenegger's voice is not restored when Hercules speaks to Pretzie through his small transistor radio, since that scene was shot without Schwarzenegger present and the voice was added via ADR.

Release

Copyright
On October 19, 2006, the San Francisco Chronicle reported that rightsholder Premiere Pictures was auctioning off the rights to the film on eBay for a minimum bid of $550,000.

See also
 List of American films of 1970
 Arnold Schwarzenegger filmography
 List of films featuring Hercules

Notes

References

External links
 
 
 

1970 films
1970s adventure comedy films
1970s fantasy comedy films
1970 independent films
American adventure comedy films
American fantasy comedy films
American independent films
1970s English-language films
American fantasy adventure films
Films about Heracles
Films directed by Arthur Allan Seidelman
Films set in New York City
Films shot in New York City
1970 directorial debut films
1970 comedy films
Films produced by Aubrey Wisberg
Films with screenplays by Aubrey Wisberg
1970s American films